Traditional Kazakh cuisine is the traditional food of the Kazakh people. It is focused on mutton and horse meat, as well as various milk products. For hundreds of years, Kazakhs were herders who raised fat-tailed sheep, Bactrian camels, and horses, relying on these animals for transportation, clothing, and food. The cooking techniques and major ingredients have been strongly influenced by the nation's nomadic way of life. For example, most cooking techniques are aimed at long-term preservation of food. There is a large practice of salting and drying meat so that it will last, and there is a preference for sour milk, as it is easier to save in a nomadic lifestyle.

Meat in various forms has always been the primary ingredient of Kazakh cuisine, and traditional Kazakh cooking is based on boiling. Horse and mutton are the most popular forms of meat and are most often served in large uncut pieces which have been boiled. Kazakhs cared especially for horses which they intended to slaughter—keeping them separate from other animals and feeding them so much that they often became so fat they had difficulty moving.

Common and traditional dishes

Meat dishes 
The majority of Kazakh cuisine is  – four kinds of cattle (i.e. four kinds of meat): horses, camels, cows, and sheep. Horse and camel meat are the two main types of festive meats, with horse being the main and camel being not as common for festivities (as camels in Kazakhstan are not as common as horses). Sheep and cow meat are more common meats and are eaten more in everyday life.

It is also called "five fingers" because of the way it is eaten. The chunks of boiled meat are cut and served by the host in order of the guests’ importance.  is usually eaten with a boiled pasta sheet, and a meat broth called , and is traditionally served in Kazakh bowls called .  is another  Kazakh's national dish.  

, also known as crackler, is melted fat in a large bowl with sugar, eaten by dipping it with bread and is often served with tea.  is a sausage made during fall and winter slaughtering and is made by stuffing intestines with pieces of ground meat, fat, blood, garlic, salt, and black pepper. , also known as käwap, is popular among hunters and travelers and is a dish in which small pieces of meat are roasted over a fire.  is a dish made from the heart, aorta, and fat of a horse, prepared in a kettle, and is often shared between sisters-in-law as a sign of unity. 

 is another kind of sausage eaten later in the year after it has aged—if smoked it will last a long time, something important in Kazakh cooking.  is the layer of fat under a horse's mane and is served only to special and honored guests, as it is such a rare commodity.  is the rump of a horse, probably served boiled.  is a white broth made in the fall, and is a special meal for rich men.  is a meal which used to be served to kinsmen at wedding parties. It is made from boiled meat, sliced thinly, then sour milk and salted broth are added.

 is salted horsemeat that smoked over elm, juniper or meadowsweet.  

=== Milk dishes ===
Traditional milk products include , which is boiled milk.  is sour cream made from boiled milk, and is sometimes served with tea.  is butter made from old milk, often in a leather bag.  is prepared by pressing thick sour cream, and is dried until white and salty.  is a cottage cheese processed in the spring, made from boiled, unskimmed milk and added sour cream. 

=== Breads ===
, a very popular Kazakh dish, is a spiced mixture of ground lamb (or beef) spiced with black pepper, enclosed in a dough wrapper.  are cooked in a multi-level steamer and served topped with butter, sour cream, or onion sauce.  is a type of traditional bread made in the  oven, popular in cities along the Silk Way.

Beverages

[[File:Kumys-bottle.jpg|thumb|upright|A bottle and glass of qymyz]]
These drinks were traditionally consumed with the main course. In the summer,  is one of the staple drinks of the Adai Kazakhs. Black tea was introduced from China after the foundation of the Silk Way and was traditionally consumed with sweets after the main course. Nowadays it has virtually replaced other traditional drinks and every meal is accompanied with tea. The tea ceremony, taking its roots from the nomads many centuries ago, is a special  ritual in Kazakhstan. Kazakh tea is typically strong black tea with milk or cream.

Desserts

They are easy to prepare in nomadic conditions - in a cauldron, and today are traditionally prepared for any celebration undoubtedly being an additional decoration of the festive table.

Influential cuisines
In addition to traditional nomadic practices and the internal development of Kazakh food and cuisine, other countries and ethnic groups have had a large influence on the food and food culture of Kazakhstan. These ethnic groups included Russians, Tatars, Ukrainians, Uzbeks, Germans, Uyghurs, Koreans, and many more. Although traditional Kazakh cuisine is based on meat and milk products, more recently, vegetables, fish and seafood, baked dishes, and sweets have been added to Kazakh cuisine.

Practice and ritual
In nomadic cookery, the amount of equipment is minimal because it must be transported from location to location to follow the grazing herds. In addition, there are no luxuries such as electricity or running water. The iron kazan is the most indispensable piece of cookware—it is used for cooking pilaf, soups, and even bread—if the kazan is shallow, it can be turned over to cook flatbread on the back. Many parts of the sheep and goat are used for holding milk products or for making cheese.

The host of the meal cuts the meat themself and gives the best cuts to more honored people or to children. This meat is most often eaten with thin boiled pieces of pastry. Sometimes the most honored guest at a meal will receive a cooked head of a ram, which is passed around in ceremonial or ritual practice. A guest is always given the place of honor and a special welcome in Kazakh practice.

Kazakhs traditionally eat at a low table called a dastarqan. Kazakhs also maintain a tradition of using beautiful dishware when possible.  is served in wide bowls decorated with silver or in painted cups, and meat is often served on wide platters. Tea is steeped in ornate teapots and served in lovely cups. Unusual ingredients such as dried melon and small intestines were regularly woven into interesting patterns, and the bread boasted floral designs painted with berry juice. Bigger and deeper bowls are used to serve dairy products, and small wooden basins are used for making dough. Further more, each family has their own wooden spoons, which are cared for and transported in felt and wooden cases, showing their importance in food culture in Kazakhstan.

Kazakhs like other Central Asian nations have some special rules of "tea ceremony". Traditionally it is not allowed to pour tea to the brim of the cup called . The less tea is poured the more respect is given to the guest. It is explained by saying that if the host pours too much tea, it looks like he wants the guest to leave sooner. The less tea is poured, the more the host has to pour it over and over again, so that the guest always has hot tea, which shows care for the guest. However, different regions may have different understandings of the amount of "tea with respect".

See also

 , a traditional sausage-like food of Kazakhs, Tatars, Kyrgyz, and other ethnic groups mainly of Central Asia, particularly those of Turkic origin.
Historian and ethnographer, Aigerim Musagazhinova, restored over 200 traditional and forgotten Kazakh recipes in a TV series called "The Mysteries Around Us".

References

External links
 Kazakh food and traditions
 Kazakh dining
 New York Times article on the role of horses in Kazakhstan society and cuisine, describing a village horse slaughter and recipes

 
Central Asian cuisine